USS Atlanta (SSN-712), a , was the fifth ship of the United States Navy to be named for Atlanta, Georgia. The contract to build her was awarded to Newport News Shipbuilding and Dry Dock Company in Newport News, Virginia, on 1 August 1975 and her keel was laid down on 17 August 1978.  She was launched on 16 August 1980 sponsored by Mrs. Sam Nunn, and commissioned on 6 March 1982, with Commander Robin J. White in command.

On 29 April 1986 Atlanta ran aground in the Strait of Gibraltar, damaging her sonar gear and puncturing a ballast tank in the bow section. The boat proceeded to Gibraltar under her own power.  After a week, the Atlanta returned to Norfolk, VA under its own power, and was repaired in the Norfolk Naval Shipyard in Portsmouth, Virginia.

During Atlanta'''s brief career, she completed six deployments to the Mediterranean Sea and three deployments to the western Atlantic.  She was the first submarine certified to employ the Mark 48 torpedo and both Harpoon missiles and Tomahawk missiles. She was also the first nuclear-powered submarine assigned to directly support an Amphibious Ready Group (ARG).Atlanta'' was decommissioned and stricken from the Naval Vessel Register on 16 December 1999.  She was berthed at the Norfolk Naval Shipyard in Portsmouth, Virginia, awaiting entry into the Nuclear Powered Ship and Submarine Recycling Program in Bremerton, Washington.

References 
This article includes information collected from the Naval Vessel Register as well as various press releases and news stories.

Los Angeles-class submarines
Cold War submarines of the United States
Nuclear submarines of the United States Navy
United States submarine accidents
Maritime incidents in 1986
1980 ships
Ships built in Newport News, Virginia